Brunei competed at the 2013 Asian Indoor and Martial Arts Games held in Incheon, South Korea from June 26 to July 6 2013. Brunei left without a medal.

Chess

Brunei participated in chess.

Men's Individual

Cue sports

Brunei participated in cue sports.

Men

Short course swimming

Brunei participated in short course swimming.

Men

References 

2013 in Bruneian sport
Nations at the 2013 Asian Indoor and Martial Arts Games